Leonardo Bujas (18 November 1904 – 4 May 1981) was a Croatian rower. He competed in the men's eight event at the 1936 Summer Olympics.

References

1904 births
1981 deaths
Croatian male rowers
Olympic rowers of Yugoslavia
Rowers at the 1936 Summer Olympics
Sportspeople from Šibenik